Martin Lynch may refer to:
 Martin Lynch (Irish republican), reportedly a member of the Provisional Irish Republican Army Army Council
 Martin Lynch (mayor), mayor of Galway
 Martin Lynch (writer), playwright and theatre director from Belfast
 Marty Lynch, Australian rules footballer